Rendle McNeilage "Mac" Holten CMG (29 March 1922 – 12 October 1996) was an Australian politician and sportsman. He was a member of the Country Party and represented the Division of Indi in the House of Representatives from 1958 to 1977. He served as Minister for Repatriation from 1969 to 1972 in the Gorton and McMahon Governments. Before entering politics he played Australian rules football for the Collingwood Football Club

Early life and sporting career

Holten was born in Melbourne and educated at Scotch College, Melbourne.  He left school at 16 to sell life insurance, but with the outbreak of World War II joined the Royal Australian Air Force in 1940 as a flying instructor and test pilot.  He retired in 1946 with the rank of Flight Lieutenant and became a grocer.  He kicked 83 goals in 82 games for Collingwood Football Club where he played in three losing Preliminary Finals and was also Vice-Captain of the Melbourne Cricket Club at one time.  On 1949 he moved to Wangaratta to coach the Wangaratta Football Club.

Politics
Holten was elected as the Country Party member for Indi in the Australian House of Representatives from the 1958 election until his defeat by the Liberal candidate at the 1977 election.  He was  Minister for Repatriation from November 1969 to the McMahon government's defeat at the  1972 election.  As minister he introduced bills, the Native Members of the Forces Benefits Bill 1972 and the Repatriation (Torres Strait Islanders) Bill 1972, to abolish discrimination in the level of benefits for indigenous Australians who had served in World War II.

Later life
Holten was Administrator of Christmas Island from 1980 to 1982. He was appointed a Companion of the  Order of St Michael and St George for his parliamentary and community service in 1980.  He was survived by his wife, Shirley, and three daughters.

Notes

External links

National Party of Australia members of the Parliament of Australia
Members of the Australian House of Representatives for Indi
Members of the Australian House of Representatives
Australian Companions of the Order of St Michael and St George
Collingwood Football Club players
Wangaratta Football Club players
Australian sportsperson-politicians
1922 births
1996 deaths
Christmas Island administrators
Melbourne Cricket Club cricketers
People educated at Scotch College, Melbourne
Australian rules footballers from Victoria (Australia)
20th-century Australian politicians
Royal Australian Air Force personnel of World War II
Australian World War II pilots